Dolichopus lepidus is a species of fly in the family Dolichopodidae. It is found in the Palearctic.

The name Dolichopus lepidus was declared a nomen protectum, so it has precedence over the senior synonym Dolichopus tibialis (a nomen oblitum).

Dolichopus microstigma Stackelberg, 1930 was originally described as a variation of D. lepidus, and was later considered a subspecies of the species, but it is now considered a separate species.

References

External links
Images representing Dolichopus at BOLD

lepidus
Insects described in 1842
Taxa named by Rasmus Carl Stæger
Diptera of Europe
Palearctic insects